The Kwekwe Solar Power Station is a proposed  solar power plant in Zimbabwe. The power station is under development by a consortium comprising Tatanga Energy, an independent power producer (IPP) and Sable Chemical Industries, a fertilizer-manufacturing company. The energy generated by this station is intended for use, primarily in the fertilizer factory, with the excess sold to Zimbabwe Electricity Supply Authority (ZESA), for integration into the national electricity grid.

Location

Overview
The power station, which will be developed in phases, has a maximum generation capacity of the first phase of 50 megawatts. The solar farm's output will be used, primarily, in the ammonium nitrate manufacturing factory. Any excess energy will be sold to ZESA, for integration into the Zimbabwean national electricity grid.

As part of the first phase of this project, an 88kV high voltage transmission power line will be constructed to link with "the adjacent 88kV power line connecting Sable Chemicals substation to Sherwood substation".

The owner/developers of the power station have plans to expand its capacity in the future, from 50 megawatts to 150 megawatts.

Developers
The power station is under development as a joint venture between Tatanga Energy, a Zimbabwean IPP and Sable Chemical Industries Limited, a Zimbabwean fertilizer manufacturer.

See also

 List of power stations in Zimbabwe
 Harava Solar Power Station

References

External links
 Sable Chemicals and Tatanga Energy to construct solar energy plant in Zimbabwe As of 27 January 2020.

Solar power stations in Zimbabwe
Midlands Province
Proposed solar power stations